Stephen Okechukwu Keshi (23 January 1962 – 7 June 2016) was a Nigerian football player and manager.

During his playing career, Keshi played as a defender and earned 60 caps for the Nigeria national team, making him the nation's second-most capped player at the time of his retirement. He represented the country at the 1994 FIFA World Cup and the 1994 Africa Cup of Nations, captaining the Super Eagles to victory in the latter. He also played club football in five countries, most notably Belgium, where he won the Belgian league championship with R.S.C. Anderlecht in 1991.

As a manager, Keshi achieved success by qualifying Togo for the only FIFA World Cup appearance in its history in 2006. However, he left the position prior to the tournament and was replaced by Otto Pfister. He later coached his native Nigeria, where he became one of only two people, along with Egypt's Mahmoud El-Gohary, to have won the Africa Cup of Nations as both a player and a coach.

Playing career

After a playing career mostly with Belgian clubs, where he won the Belgian league championship with R.S.C. Anderlecht in 1991.  Keshi went to the United States to be educated in coaching.

Coaching career
In 1996, he was joined by Augustine Eguavoen, who once coached the Nigerian national team. They played together in California as the backbone of the defence for the short-lived Sacramento Scorpions. Keshi has been a part of the coaching staff for the Nigerian national team, most notably as head coach for the Junior Eagles at the 2001 African Youth Championship which also served as qualification for the 2001 FIFA World Youth Championship, without success.

Between 2004 and 2006 Keshi coached the Togo national team, surprisingly bringing them to their first World Cup tournament, Germany 2006. Having secured Togo's unlikely qualification, he was promptly replaced by German coach Otto Pfister prior to the World Cup finals, after Togo showed a dismal performance and failed to advance to the knock-out stage in 2006 Africa Cup of Nations in Egypt. However, Pfister did not last beyond a controversial World Cup campaign that nearly resulted in a player's strike over pay and Togo remained without a manager until February 2007 when they re-engaged Keshi in time for a friendly against Cameroon.

He worked as manager of the Mali national team, after being appointed in April 2008 on a two-year deal. Keshi was sacked in January 2010, after Mali's early exit in the group stages of the 2010 Africa Cup of Nations.

Nigeria national team
Keshi became coach of the Nigeria national team in 2011. He led Nigeria to qualification for the 2013 Africa Cup of Nations, which they went on to win, defeating Burkina Faso 1–0 in the final. The following day Keshi handed in his resignation, only to reverse his decision the day after. Keshi led Nigeria to the 2013 Confederations Cup, defeated Tahiti 6–1, and lost 2–1 to Uruguay in the second game, and also lost 3–0 to World Cup winners, Spain in their final group game.

On 16 November 2013, Keshi's Nigeria secured qualification to the 2014 World Cup by beating Ethiopia 4–1 on aggregate in a play-off. Keshi set a record in African football by being the first African coach to qualify two African nations (Nigeria and Togo) for the World Cup Finals in 2005 and in 2013. He also helped Nigeria become the first country to achieve an African Cup of Nations trophy and World Cup qualification, both in 2013.

Nigeria progressed to the knockout stage of 2014 World Cup. They started the tournament with a 0–0 draw against Iran, followed by a controversial 1–0 win over Bosnia and Herzegovina. They lost the final group stage match 3–2 against Argentina, but progressed to the knockout stage, courtesy of a 3–1 win by Bosnia and Herzegovina over Iran. The Super Eagles lost to France in the first knock-out round. After the match, Keshi announced his resignation as Super Eagles coach but later reversed the decision after the Nigerian Football Federation renewed his contract.

His team failed to win a single game in the Morocco 2015 African Cup of Nations qualifying series and he announced he would move to another job if pressure continues to mount because of certain people, whom he refused to name, were trying to "sabotage" him. However, he stated that he will continue to coach the Super Eagles because he loves the team and he loves his country.

In July 2014, following Nigeria's exit from the World Cup, Keshi's contract with the Nigeria Football Federation (NFF) expired and was not renewed. A statement by the NFF Executive Committee said the decision was made, having thoroughly reviewed the reports/findings of the NFF Disciplinary Committee and NFF Technical and Development Committee, as well as having reviewed the actions and inaction of Stephen Keshi, in the performance of his duties as Super Eagles' Head Coach, which NFF found to lack the required commitment to achieve the Federation's objectives as set out in the Coach's employment contract.

Personal life
Keshi was born on 23 January 1962 in Azare, Bauchi State. He hailed from Illah in Oshimili North Local Government Area of Delta State and was of Igbo descent. Keshi had his early education at Saint Paul's Catholic Nursery and Primary School, Apapa Road, Lagos State. He proceeded to Saint Finbarrs’ College, Akoka, Lagos in 1976.
Keshi was married to his wife Kate (née Aburime) for 30 years. She died on 10 December 2015, after battling cancer for three years. They had four children. Their oldest son Kos Keshi played football professionally.

Keshi had a heart attack and died en route to hospital on 7 June 2016 in Benin City, aged 54. His wife had died the previous December.

Legacy
Keshi was honoured by Google with a doodle on what would have been his 56th birthday.

Honours

Player 
New Nigeria Bank
West African Club Championship: 1983, 1984

Stade d'Abidjan
Coupe Houphoet Boigny: 1985

'''Africa Sports
Côte d'Ivoire Premier Division: 1986
Côte d'Ivoire Coupe: 1986
West African Club Championship: 1986
Coupe Houphoet Boigny: 1986
Anderlecht

 Belgian First Division: 1986–87, 1990–91
 Belgian Cup: 1988–89, 1989–90
 Belgian Supercup: 1987
 European Cup Winners' Cup: 1989-90 (runners-up) 
 Bruges Matins: 1988

Nigeria
Africa Cup of Nations: 1994

Manager
Nigeria
Africa Cup of Nations: 2013
 Confederations of African Football – African Coach of the Year 2013.

References

External links
 

1962 births
2016 deaths
People from Bauchi State
Nigerian footballers
Association football defenders
St Gregory's College, Lagos alumni
ACB Lagos F.C. players
New Nigerian Bank F.C. players
Stade d'Abidjan players
Africa Sports d'Abidjan players
K.S.C. Lokeren Oost-Vlaanderen players
R.S.C. Anderlecht players
RC Strasbourg Alsace players
R.W.D. Molenbeek players
Central California Valley Hydra players
Sacramento Scorpions players
Perlis FA players
Nigeria Professional Football League players
Ligue 1 (Ivory Coast) players
Belgian Pro League players
Ligue 2 players
Ligue 1 players
USISL players
Malaysia Super League players
Nigeria international footballers
1982 African Cup of Nations players
1988 African Cup of Nations players
1992 African Cup of Nations players
1994 African Cup of Nations players
1994 FIFA World Cup players
1995 King Fahd Cup players
Africa Cup of Nations-winning players
Nigerian expatriate footballers
Nigerian expatriate sportspeople in Ivory Coast
Nigerian expatriate sportspeople in Belgium
Nigerian expatriate sportspeople in France
Nigerian expatriate sportspeople in the United States
Nigerian expatriate sportspeople in Malaysia
Expatriate footballers in Ivory Coast
Expatriate footballers in Belgium
Expatriate footballers in France
Expatriate soccer players in the United States
Expatriate footballers in Malaysia
Nigerian football managers
Togo national football team managers
Mali national football team managers
Nigeria national football team managers
2006 Africa Cup of Nations managers
2010 Africa Cup of Nations managers
2013 Africa Cup of Nations managers
2013 FIFA Confederations Cup managers
2014 FIFA World Cup managers
Nigerian expatriate football managers
Nigerian expatriate sportspeople in Togo
Nigerian expatriate sportspeople in Mali